Gerard Fitzgerald may refer to:
 Gerard FitzGerald, Australian rules footballer
 Gerard George Fitzgerald, member of parliament in New Zealand

See also
 Gerald Fitzgerald (disambiguation)